June Gibbs (June 13, 1922 – April 8, 2012) was an American politician who served in the Rhode Island Senate from 1985 to 2009.

She died of cancer on April 8, 2012, in Middletown, Rhode Island at age 89.

References

1922 births
2012 deaths
Republican Party Rhode Island state senators